Ayer is a surname. Notable people with the surname include:

A. J. Ayer (1910–1989), British philosopher
Caleb Ayer (1813–1883), American politician
Claire D. Ayer (born 1948), Vermont politician 
David Ayer (born 1968), American screenwriter
Donald B. Ayer (born 1949), United States Deputy Attorney General
Edward E. Ayer (1841–1927), American antiquarian and benefactor of Newberry Library and the Field Museum of Natural History
Francis Ayer (1848–1923), American advertising businessman
Frederick Ayer (1822–1918), American businessman
Frederick Ayer Jr. (1915–1974), American government official
Harriet Hubbard Ayer (1849–1903), American cosmetics entrepreneur and journalist
Hilal Tuba Tosun Ayer (born 1970), Turkish female referee
James Cook Ayer (1818–1878), American patent medicine businessman
Lewis Malone Ayer Jr. (1821–1895), Confederate politician
Nat Ayer (1887–1952), British-American composer
Richard S. Ayer (1829–1896), U.S. Representative from Virginia